Michael Tierney (30 September 1894 – 10 May 1975) was Professor of Greek at University College Dublin (UCD) from 1923 to 1947 and President of UCD between 1947 and 1964, and was also a Cumann na nGaedheal (and later Fine Gael) politician.

Biography
Tierney was born in 1894 in the townland of Esker, near Castleblakeney, County Galway, the son of Michael Tierney, a farmer, and Bridget Finn. He attended St Joseph's College, Ballinasloe, and entered UCD in October 1911. He graduated in 1914 with a first-class honours degree in Ancient Classics. Two years later he was awarded his MA degree, and he worked as an assistant lecturer in Greek from 1918 to 1919 and 1920 to 1922. In 1917 he won a National University of Ireland (NUI) travelling studentship in Classics and used it to study in the Sorbonne, British School at Athens and Berlin from 1919 to 1921. He was appointed to the Chair of Greek in 1922.

Tierney was elected a Cumann na nGaedheal Teachta Dála (TD) for Mayo North in a by-election in 1925 and for the NUI constituency in 1927, a seat he held until 1932.

Tierney came to corporatism through a study of Catholic social thought, and through an analysis of continental systems of corporatism, particularly those of Portugal and Austria. He was an early member of the Army Comrades Association (later known as the Blueshirts) and, along with Ernest Blythe, encouraged Eoin O'Duffy to become the leader. Tierney suggested the name "Fine Gael" for a merger between his party, the Centre Party and the Blueshirts.

He was a member of Seanad Éireann from 1938 to 1944. He was the prime mover behind the transfer of UCD to its present site at Belfield.

On 28 June 1923, he married Eibhlín MacNeill, daughter of Eoin MacNeill; they had five sons and two daughters. He wrote a biography of his father-in-law, Eoin MacNeill: scholar and man of action (1980).

References

External links

Tierney/MacNeill Photographs, collection of over 500 images, the largest parts of the collection relate to the political and academic careers of Eoin MacNeill and his son-in-law Michael Tierney. A UCD Digital Library Collection.

1894 births
1975 deaths
Academics of University College Dublin
Alumni of University College Dublin
Cumann na nGaedheal TDs
Fine Gael senators
People educated at Garbally College
Politicians from County Galway
Presidential appointees to the Council of State (Ireland)
Presidents of University College Dublin
Members of Seanad Éireann for the National University of Ireland
Members of the 4th Dáil
Members of the 6th Dáil
Members of the 2nd Seanad
Members of the 3rd Seanad
Members of the 4th Seanad
Members of the Blueshirts
Teachtaí Dála for the National University of Ireland